Helge Anshushaug (born 29 January 1948) is a retired Norwegian sport shooter. He was born in Soknedal. He competed at the 1972 Summer Olympics in Munich and at the 1976 Summer Olympics in Montreal.

References

1948 births
Living people
People from Midtre Gauldal
Norwegian male sport shooters
Olympic shooters of Norway
Shooters at the 1972 Summer Olympics
Shooters at the 1976 Summer Olympics
Sportspeople from Trøndelag
20th-century Norwegian people